The 1981 Stanley Cup Finals was the championship series of the National Hockey League's (NHL) 1980–81 season, and the culmination of the 1981 Stanley Cup playoffs. It was contested by the Minnesota North Stars, making their first Finals appearance, and the defending champion New York Islanders, in their second Finals appearance. The Islanders would win the best-of-seven series, four games to one, to win their second Stanley Cup championship. This would be the last all-American Finals until , when the North Stars faced the Pittsburgh Penguins. Butch Goring won the Conn Smythe Trophy as Most Valuable Player in the playoffs.

Paths to the Finals

Minnesota defeated the Boston Bruins 3–0, the Buffalo Sabres 4–1 and the Calgary Flames 4–2 to advance to the Final.

New York defeated the Toronto Maple Leafs 3–0, the Edmonton Oilers 4–2, and the New York Rangers 4–0 to reach the Final.

Game summaries
Dino Ciccarelli of the North Stars set a rookie record (since tied by Ville Leino in ), scoring twenty-one points (14 goals and seven assists) during the year's playoffs. The Islanders' much deeper lineup, however, won the day.

New York wins the series 4–1.

Broadcasting
The series aired on CBC in Canada. In the United States, this was the first of five seasons that the Cup Finals aired on the USA Network. For the 1981 Finals only, USA simulcast the CBC feed instead of producing their own coverage.

Team rosters

Minnesota North Stars

|}

New York Islanders

|}

Stanley Cup engraving
The 1981 Stanley Cup was presented to Islanders captain Denis Potvin by NHL President John Ziegler following the Islanders 5–1 win over the North Stars in game five.

The following Islanders players and staff had their names engraved on the Stanley Cup

1980–81 New York Islanders

See also
 List of Stanley Cup champions
 1980–81 NHL season

References
 
 

 
Stanley
Stanley Cup Finals
Stan
New York Islanders games
May 1981 sports events in the United States
Ice hockey competitions in Minnesota
1981 in sports in Minnesota
Ice hockey competitions in New York (state)
1982 in sports in New York (state)